William P. Wingate (1939 – August 2012) was an author. His work includes the novel Shotgun, which was adapted into the 1987 film Malone starring Burt Reynolds.

Life and works
Wingate was born Ronald Ivan Grbich in South Africa. He was a lawyer as well as a writer.

The book Malone was based on was originally published as Hardacre's Way. The U.S. edition was published under the title Shotgun. Kirkus gave Shotgun an unfavorable review calling it a retread of Shane. A review of the book in New York Times states that "There is nothing at all new in the book, but Mr. Wingate tells his story very well, and there is something in all of us that responds joyously to the sight of an avenging angel destroying bullies and the forces of evil." The book takes place in the Blue Ridge Mountains, but the movie is set in Oregon.

Wingate was also a co-producer of the 1981 film Zoot Suit.

Bibliography
Fireplay (1977)
Blood Bath (1978)
Shotgun (1981), also known as Hardacre or Hardacre's Way
Crystal (1983)
The Don: How to Run a Mafia Family
Hong Kong, Let Candice Go!
Doneska
Wake Up Late, Read This ... Play Winning Poker Before Noon (2011), non-fiction book about playing poker

References

1939 births
2012 deaths
20th-century South African lawyers
South African male writers